Mayūrāsana or Peacock pose is a hand-balancing asana in hatha yoga and modern yoga as exercise with the body held horizontal over the hands. It is one of the oldest non-seated asanas.

Etymology and origins

The name comes from the Sanskrit words mayūra (मयूर) meaning "peacock" and āsana (आसन) meaning "posture".

Mayurasana is one of the oldest non-seated asanas used in hatha yoga; it is first described in the 10th century Vimānārcanākalpa. The Vāsiṣṭha Saṁhitā 1.76-7 states that it destroys all sins.

Description
In this asana the body is raised like a horizontal stick holding the floor with both palms while the body is supported by the elbows.

Variations

Hamsasana (Swan Pose) is identical to Mayurasana except that the hands are placed with the fingers pointing forwards.

Padma Mayurasana (Lotus in Peacock Pose) has the legs crossed as in Lotus Position.

See also
 List of asanas
 Planche (exercise)
 Vrischikasana, scorpion pose, with variations including Pincha Mayurasana

References

Sources

External links
 Step by Step instruction

Balancing asanas
Medieval Hatha Yoga asanas